Nepytia janetae is a species of moth in the family Geometridae (geometrid moths).
It was described by Frederick H. Rindge in 1967 and is found in North America.

The MONA or Hodges number for Nepytia janetae is 6902.

References

Further reading
 Arnett, Ross H. (2000). American Insects: A Handbook of the Insects of America North of Mexico. CRC Press.
 Scoble, Malcolm J., ed. (1999). Geometrid Moths of the World: A Catalogue (Lepidoptera, Geometridae). 1016.

External links
Butterflies and Moths of North America

Geometridae
Moths described in 1967